According to the Hebrew Bible, the Abiezrites were the descendants of Abiezer, the son of Gilead. Joash and Gideon were members of this clan: Gideon describes the Abiezrites, as "the weakest in [the tribe of] Manasseh".

References

External links
Abiezrite

Hebrew Bible nations